Joseph "Joe" Haveman (born February 21, 1961) is a Republican politician from Michigan who previously served in the Michigan House of Representatives. For the 97th Legislature, Haveman was the Chairman of the Committee on Appropriations. In March 2017, Haveman filed to run for State Senator of the 30th district.

Prior to his election to the Legislature, Haveman was director of business development at GDK Construction, executive director of the Holland Home Builders Association, and a former member of both Holland City Council and the Ottawa County Board of Commissioners.

Haveman is also active in the Republican Party as a member of the Ottawa County Republican Party's Executive Committee.

References

1961 births
Living people
Republican Party members of the Michigan House of Representatives
People from Holland, Michigan
Ferris State University alumni
Michigan city council members
County commissioners in Michigan
21st-century American politicians